Batrachorhina is a genus of longhorn beetles of the subfamily Lamiinae, containing the following species:

subgenus Batrachorhina
 Batrachorhina albolateralis (Waterhouse, 1882)
 Batrachorhina albostrigosa (Fairmaire, 1893)
 Batrachorhina bipuncticollis Breuning, 1961
 Batrachorhina cristata Breuning, 1938
 Batrachorhina griseicornis Breuning, 1957
 Batrachorhina niveoscutellata Breuning, 1940
 Batrachorhina postmaculata Breuning, 1957
 Batrachorhina pruinosa (Fairmaire, 1871)
 Batrachorhina rodriguezi Breuning, 1948
 Batrachorhina semiluctuosa (Fairmaire, 1901)
 Batrachorhina similis Breuning, 1938
 Batrachorhina sogai Breuning, 1980
 Batrachorhina subgriseicornis Breuning, 1961
 Batrachorhina vulpina (Klug, 1833)

subgenus Coedomea
 Batrachorhina affinis Breuning, 1938
 Batrachorhina albopicta Breuning, 1938
 Batrachorhina albovaria Breuning, 1942
 Batrachorhina apicepicta (Fairmaire, 1901)
 Batrachorhina cruciata Breuning, 1940
 Batrachorhina descarpentriesi Breuning, 1957
 Batrachorhina distigma (Fairmaire, 1893)
 Batrachorhina flavomarmorata Breuning, 1938
 Batrachorhina flavoplagiata Breuning, 1938
 Batrachorhina fuscolateralis Breuning, 1939
 Batrachorhina griseiventris Breuning, 1942
 Batrachorhina griseofasciata Breuning, 1938
 Batrachorhina griseoplagiata Breuning, 1938
 Batrachorhina induta (Fairmaire, 1902)
 Batrachorhina kenyana Breuning, 1958
 Batrachorhina lactaria (Fairmaire, 1894)
 Batrachorhina lateritia (Fairmaire, 1894)
 Batrachorhina madagascariensis (Thomson, 1868)
 Batrachorhina medioalba Breuning, 1970
 Batrachorhina mediomaculata Breuning, 1942
 Batrachorhina nebulosa (Fairmaire, 1904)
 Batrachorhina nervulata (Fairmaire, 1894)
 Batrachorhina niviscutata (Fabricius, 1901)
 Batrachorhina orientalis Breuning, 1956
 Batrachorhina paralateritia Breuning, 1970
 Batrachorhina paraniviscutata Breuning, 1975
 Batrachorhina ratovosoni Breuning, 1970
 Batrachorhina rufina (Fairmaire, 1897)
 Batrachorhina strandi Breuning, 1938
 Batrachorhina vadoniana Breuning, 1965
 Batrachorhina vagepicta (Fairmaire, 1901)
 Batrachorhina vieui Breuning, 1965
 Batrachorhina wittei Breuning, 1954

subgenus Setocoedomea
 Batrachorhina alboplagiata Breuning, 1948
 Batrachorhina niveoplagiata Breuning, 1948
 Batrachorhina simillima Breuning, 1948

subgenus Soridus
 Batrachorhina approximata Breuning, 1940
 Batrachorhina biapicata (Chevrolat, 1857)
 Batrachorhina bipunctipennis Breuning, 1957
 Batrachorhina cephalotes Breuning, 1939
 Batrachorhina excavata Breuning, 1942
 Batrachorhina fasciculata Breuning, 1938
 Batrachorhina flavoapicalis Breuning, 1970
 Batrachorhina grisea (Distant, 1905)
 Batrachorhina jejuna Kolbe, 1894
 Batrachorhina lichenea (Fairmaire, 1902)
 Batrachorhina miredoxa Téocchi, 1986
 Batrachorhina mirei Breuning, 1969 
 Batrachorhina paralichenea Breuning, 1970
 Batrachorhina principis (Aurivillius, 1910)
 Batrachorhina tanganjicae Breuning, 1961

subgenus Trichocoedomea
 Batrachorhina griseotincta (Fairmaire, 1904)
 Batrachorhina obliquevittata Breuning, 1938
 Batrachorhina paragriseotincta Breuning, 1980
 Batrachorhina tuberculicollis Breuning, 1957
 Batrachorhina vadoni Breuning, 1957

References

 
Pteropliini